Dr. Ed and Friends (formerly Dr. Ed and the Flu Shots), is a nine-piece reggae influenced funk/rock band from the Chicago area. This band has been together since 2004 and has experienced transitions from its ska-punk beginnings to the funk rhythms and heavy rock jams that cultivate its progression. A long history and connection between these musicians brings an original style molded over the years and yields a tight performance that is almost effortless between these musicians.

Doctor Ed has a unique conglomerate of influences that include Galactic, The Derek Trucks Band, Lettuce, Sly & the Family Stone, Thievery Corporation, Medeski Scofield Martin and Wood, Curtis Mayfield, Sublime, and Pink Floyd. Among many other influences, new and old, our music creates an ecstatic atmosphere of durty funk that gets you on your feet and heavy rock settling down on sweet reggae music for our audiences’ pleasure. Our versatile style allows us to feel out different crowds and adjust our sets between the many funk, reggae, and rock songs in our catalog.

The band has a deep love and connection to all of our wonderful friends and fans that make every show such an amazing experience, always. We invite all to come out and dance, laugh, live, and love among our raging community growing to define the rhythm of support in the music scene. We love what we're doing and welcome everyone to be a part in it!

As Dr. Ed and the Flu Shots, they've opened for touring bands like Big D & the Kids Table, Mad Conductor, Synthetic Elements, Evil Empire, Suburban Legends, Patent Pending, MSC, Knock Out, Fatter Than Albert, One Night Band, The Expos, and Voodoo Glow Skulls.

Members
Eddie Kulack — Vocals
Nick Cardelli — Guitar
Noe Perez — Guitar
Brian Roberts — Bass
Luke Lleras — Drums
Drew Settipani — Trumpet
Devon Bates; Percussion
Nick Bush — Alto Saxophone
Drew Steury — Trombone

Frequent Guest
Maxx McGathey — Keyboard

Discography

Albums
 Kool-Aid Kids vs Dr. Ed and the Flu Shots (2006)
 The Loyal Opposition
 "Friendzy!" (2010)

External links

Official site
Interpunk

American psychedelic rock music groups